An Incendiary kite(also Firebomb kite, flaming kite, Fire Kite) is a kite with a bomb, incendiary device, or Molotov cocktail attached.

Historical use 
Kites were first used in warfare by the Chinese. During the Song dynasty the Fire Crow, a kite carrying incendiary powder, a fuse and a burning stick of incense, was developed as a weapon. Walter de Milemete's 1326 De nobilitatibus, sapientiis, et prudentiis regum treatise depicts a group of knights flying a kite laden with a black-powder-filled firebomb over the wall of a city. According to Samguk Sagi, in 647 Kim Yu-sin, a Korean general of Silla, rallied his troops to defeat rebels by using flaming kites which also scared the enemy. In the 17th century, the forces of Thai king Phetracha tied gunpowder barrels to kites used for airborne assault.

Gaza Strip use 

During the 2018 Gaza border protests Palestinians from the Gaza Strip have flown fire bomb kites over the Israel–Gaza barrier, setting fires on the Israeli side of the border, Since the beginning of May 2018, longer range helium filled incendiary balloons, devised from party balloons and condoms, have been used alongside the kites. In one instance, a falcon outfitted with a harness with flaming material at the end was utilized as well.

See also
 Incendiary balloon

References 

Kites
Bombs
Improvised weapons
Incendiary weapons